The 1942 Belize hurricane was one of only two known hurricanes to strike Belize in the month of November, alongside Hurricane Lisa in 2022. The thirteenth observed tropical cyclone, eleventh tropical storm, and fourth hurricane of the 1942 Atlantic hurricane season, this storm was detected in the vicinity of Turks and Caicos Islands on November 5. Initially a tropical storm, it strengthened slowly while moving westward and then south-southwestward across the Bahamas. On November 6, the storm became a Category 1 hurricane on the modern day Saffir–Simpson hurricane wind scale. Later that day, it made landfall in Cayo Romano, Camagüey Province, Cuba. Impact in Cuba and the Bahamas was limited to lower barometric pressure readings and strong winds. While crossing Cuba, the system weakened to a tropical storm early on November 7, shortly before emerging into the Caribbean Sea. The storm re-strengthened into a hurricane later that day and headed southwestward.

Late on November 8, this system curved westward and intensified into a Category 2 hurricane. Six hours later, it peaked with winds of 110 mph (175 km/h). Early on November 9, the storm struck Caye Caulker and northern Belize District. Rapidly weakening, the system fell to tropical storm status within 12 hours of landfall. By early on November 10, it emerged into the Bay of Campeche. The storm meandered erratically until striking the Yucatán Peninsula on November 11 and dissipating hours later. Strong winds were observed in Belize and Mexico's Yucatan Peninsula. Severe damage was reported in the former. About 90% of structures in San Pedro Town were destroyed, while Newtown was obliterated, causing its residents to relocate and establish the village of Hopkins. Trees and crops such as coconuts also suffered heavy losses. Overall, nine deaths and approximately $4 million (1942 USD) in damage were reported.

Meteorological history

A tropical wave moved through the West Indies between November 3 and November 4. The wave reached the vicinity of Turks and Caicos Islands on November 5, where it developed into a tropical storm at 0000 UTC. The storm moved north-northwestward and then westward across the southern Bahamas. A ridge aloft blocked the storm's westward progress and caused it to re-curve west-southwestward on November 6. The system strengthened into a Category 1 hurricane at 1200 UTC on the modern day Saffir–Simpson hurricane wind scale. Around 1800 UTC on November 6, the storm made landfall on Cayo Romano in Camagüey Province with winds of 80 mph (130 km/h). The system quickly weakened while crossing the mountainous terrain of Cuba and fell to tropical storm intensity early on November 7, shortly before emerging into the northwestern Caribbean Sea. Later that day, the storm re-intensified into a Category 1 hurricane and continued on a southwestward path.

Around midday on November 8, the storm curved westward while approaching Belize and strengthened into a Category 2 hurricane. Shortly thereafter, the hurricane attained its maximum sustained wind speed of 110 mph (175 km/h); this may be a conservative assessment, as it is possible the storm strengthened into a major hurricane, but there was no conclusive data. This storm was the only known hurricane to strike Belize in the month of November. At about 0000 UTC on November 9, the storm struck Caye Caulker and then northern Belize District at the same intensity. An observatory in Belize City recorded a barometric pressure of  – the lowest in association with this storm. The storm rapidly weakened inland and fell to tropical storm intensity by 1200 UTC on November 9. It then curved northwestward, reaching the Bay of Campeche early on November 10. The storm drifted erratically to the west of the Yucatán Peninsula and eventually curved southeastward. Around 1200 UTC on November 11, the system made another landfall near Campeche, Campeche with winds of 45 mph (75 km/h). Less than six hours later, the storm weakened to a tropical depression and dissipated shortly thereafter.

Impact
No damage was reported in that country. Strong winds were reported in some areas of Cuba. In Mexico, the storm struck the Gulf Coast of the Yucatan Peninsula near Campeche, Campeche, where wind gust of force 9 on the Beaufort scare were observed. In Quintana Roo, damaged vegetation fueled a large forest fire.

Although the storm's intensity was equivalent to a Category 2 hurricane, sustained winds in Belize reached only . In San Pedro Town, about 90% of structures were destroyed. Newtown was completely demolished, causing its resident to establish the city of Hopkins further south. At Ambergris Caye, many houses and coconut plantations were damaged or destroyed. This forced many laborers and coconut plantation owners to seek new professions; most of them entered the fishing industry. Nine deaths were reported, though the toll may have been higher, as numerous small fishing boats were beached or swept out to sea. Widespread damage to vegetation and trees occurred. An assessment of damage after the storm indicated that more than 75% of the canopy species had been destroyed. Although the low bush was not badly damaged, about 25% to 50% of the pine trees were toppled. Damage on deep soils was largely from breakage while on shallow soils mostly from wind throw. Tides along the coast split Caye Caulker into three separate islands and swept away "everything in its path". Overall, damage totaled approximately $4 million, with $1 million to private and public property, including buildings and dwellings. The remaining $3 million in damage was incurred to coconuts and other crops; this total possibly includes damage to the mahogany and chicle industries.

See also

 Hurricane Hilda (1955)
 Hurricane Richard
 Hurricane Roxanne

Notes

References

External links
 Monthly Weather Review

1942 Atlantic hurricane season
Hurricanes in Belize
Category 2 Atlantic hurricanes